The 2015 Women's Lacrosse European Championship was the 10th edition of this tournament. It was  held in Nymburk, Czech Republic on August 6–15, 2015.

17 teams will join the tournament. England is the defending champion and five nations (Belgium, Israel, Italy, Norway and Spain) will compete in the event for the first time.

Competition format
Teams have been divided in three groups of four teams and one group of five. The two top teams of each group join the championship bracket while the rest of the teams will play the classification games.

Draw
The seeding has been determined by given team’s placement at the last European Championship and the 2013 Women's Lacrosse World Cup.

First round

Group A

Group B

Group C

Group D

13th place group

9th place group

Championship bracket

Quarterfinals

5th to 8th place

7th place game

5th place game

Semifinals

3rd place game

Final

References

External links
Official website

International lacrosse competitions hosted by the Czech Republic
2015 in Czech women's sport
Women's lacrosse in the Czech Republic
Women's Lacrosse Europe
Women's international lacrosse competitions
European Lacrosse Championships